Henri Pinguenet (30 September 1889 – 26 May 1972) was a French painter. His work was part of the painting event in the art competition at the 1932 Summer Olympics.

References

1889 births
1972 deaths
20th-century French painters
20th-century French male artists
French male painters
Olympic competitors in art competitions
Painters from Paris